The Gilbert-Linn Street Historic District is a nationally recognized historic district located in Iowa City, Iowa, United States.  It was listed on the National Register of Historic Places in 2005.  At the time of its nomination it consisted of 120 resources, which included 94 contributing buildings and 26 non-contributing buildings.  This section of the city was developed as the population increased in the late 19th and early 20th centuries.  The growth was due, in part, to the expansion of the
University of Iowa and its hospitals.  There was also an expansion of the central business district at the same time.  Both professionals and business owners built houses here.  The district contains houses for the upper class and the middle class, side by side to each other.  It was also the place where German and Bohemian immigrant families resided.

The architectural styles and vernacular house forms found here are representative of those built in the city from the 1860s through the 1930s.  The Queen Anne and Greek Revival styles are particularly evident.  Local architect Orville H. Carpenter designed at least eight houses in the district.  The Emma J. Harvat and Mary E. Stach House (1918) was individually listed on the National Register of Historic Places.

References

Historic districts in Iowa City, Iowa
National Register of Historic Places in Iowa City, Iowa
Historic districts on the National Register of Historic Places in Iowa
Queen Anne architecture in Iowa
Greek Revival architecture in Iowa